Paralpenus julius is a moth of the family Erebidae. It was described by Lars Kühne in 2010. It is found in Zimbabwe.

References

Endemic fauna of Zimbabwe
Spilosomina
Moths described in 2010